Momir Ilić (born 22 December 1981) is a Serbian former handball player. 

He became the first player in the history of the EHF Champions League to score over 100 goals in three consecutive seasons. Currently he is the head coach of Telekom Veszprém.

Club career
After spending two seasons with Fidelinka, Ilić would go on to play for Gorenje Velenje (2004–2006), VfL Gummersbach (2006–2009), THW Kiel (2009–2013), and Telekom Veszprém (2013–2019). He won two EHF Champions League titles with THW Kiel in 2010 and 2012.

International career
At international level, Ilić represented Serbia and Montenegro at the 2006 European Championship. He would later play for Serbia in seven major tournaments, winning the silver medal at the 2012 European Championship.

Honours

Player Honours
VfL Gummersbach
 EHF Cup: 2008–09
THW Kiel
 Handball-Bundesliga: 2009–10, 2011–12, 2012–13
 DHB-Pokal: 2010–11, 2011–12, 2012–13
 DHB-Supercup: 2011, 2012
 EHF Champions League: 2009–10, 2011–12
 IHF Super Globe: 2011
Telekom Veszprém
 Nemzeti Bajnokság I: 2013–14, 2014–15, 2015–16, 2016–17, 2018–19
 Magyar Kupa: 2013–14, 2014–15, 2015–16, 2016–17, 2017–18
 SEHA League: 2014–15, 2015–16

Coach Honours
Telekom Veszprém
 Magyar Kupa: 2021–22
 SEHA League: 2020–21, 2021–22

References

External links

 
 
 
 MKSZ record

1981 births
Living people
People from Aranđelovac
Naturalized citizens of Hungary
Serbian male handball players
Olympic handball players of Serbia
Handball players at the 2012 Summer Olympics
RK Kolubara players
VfL Gummersbach players
THW Kiel players
Veszprém KC players
Handball-Bundesliga players
Expatriate handball players
Serbian expatriate sportspeople in Slovenia
Serbian expatriate sportspeople in Germany
Serbian expatriate sportspeople in Hungary